Ida Urr (25 November 1904, Košice - 2 August 1989, Budapest) was a Slovak-Hungarian doctor and poet.

Life 
Urr graduated in Medicine from the Eötvös Loránd University in 1929 among the first female doctors in Hungary. As a Swedish Red Cross doctor in World War II Budapest she saved many Jews from prosecution and murder by the Arrow Cross Party militias. She also hid Jews in her own home at a great risk to herself. Her sacrifices and good works were recognized by Yad Vashem, that included Ida Urr among the Righteous Among the Nations shortly before her death.

Poetry 
Urr began writing poetry already in her youth, while living in Košice before moving to Budapest for her studies. She published in Hungarian-language literary magazines in Czechoslovakia and held her first public poetry reading in Prešov in 1926. After moving to Hungary, she kept on publishing poetry reflecting social topics, including the brutality of fascism.

References

1989 deaths
Writers from Košice
Hungarians in Slovakia
Hungarian Righteous Among the Nations
20th-century Hungarian women writers
20th-century women physicians
Hungarian women physicians
Hungarian women poets
20th-century Hungarian poets
Eötvös Loránd University alumni